Whetstone Creek is a stream in Callaway and Montgomery Counties in the U.S. state of Missouri. It is a tributary of Loutre River.

Whetstone Creek was named for a nearby quarry from which settlers sourced whetstones.

See also
List of rivers of Missouri

References

Rivers of Callaway County, Missouri
Rivers of Montgomery County, Missouri
Rivers of Missouri